The House of Councillors is the upper house of the Parliament of Morocco and has 120 members, elected for a six-year term. 72 members are elected at the Kingdom's regional level, who represent the subnational administrative areas (collectivitiés territoriales); 20 members are elected in each region by a single electoral college made up of all those in the relevant region that have been elected to the following professional associations: the agriculture associations, the commerce, industry and services associations, the arts and crafts associations and the marine fisheries associations; 8 members are elected in each region by an electoral college made up of those elected from the most representative employers' professional organizations; 20 members elected nationally by an electoral college made up of employees.

The 2011 Constitution of Morocco retained this second chamber, but reduced its term of office from 9 to 6 years and its size to 120 seats.

See also
List of presidents of the House of Councillors of Morocco

References

External links
 

Morocco
Government of Morocco